SC Cham 1910 is a Swiss football team which plays in the third tier of the Swiss football pyramid. They are based in Cham and were founded in 1910.

History
The club was founded on 14 June 1910 and was the first football club in Canton Zug. They were originally known as Football-Club Cham. The club made it to the Challenge League in the 1998–99 season. They were relegated shortly afterwards but managed to return for the 2002–03 season. At the end of the 2007/08 season the club were relegated to the 1. Liga.

Stadium
The club plays its home games at Eizmoos which has a capacity of 1,800. The last time the stadium was full was in 2006 against FC Aarau. The stadium is not of a good enough standard to play in the Challenge League so in 2006–07 season and 2007–08 season the club had to play their home games at Zug 94's stadium, the Herti Allmend Stadion.

Players

Current squad

Former players

References

External links
Soccerway profile 
football.ch profile 

Football clubs in Switzerland
Association football clubs established in 1910
Cham, Switzerland
1910 establishments in Switzerland